The 4th Filmfare Awards Bangla ceremony, presented by The Times Group, will honor the best Bengali language Indian films of 2019. The ceremony was held on 31 March 2021 in Kolkata.

Winners and nominees 

 Ritwick Chakraborty — Best Supporting Actor winner for Jyeshthoputro
 Lily Chakravarty — Best Supporting Actress winner for Sanjhbati
 Ranojoy Bhattacharya — Best Lyricist for Sweater
Tarun Majumdar and Soumitra Chatterjee -Lifetime achievement award

Main Awards

References

Filmfare Awards
2019 film awards
March 2019 events in India
Events of The Times Group